Johnny Johnson is a musical with a book and lyrics by Paul Green and music by Kurt Weill. It premiered in 1936 on  Broadway.

Based on Jaroslav Hašek's 1921–1923 satiric novel The Good Soldier Švejk, the musical focuses on a naive and idealistic young man who, despite his pacifist views, leaves his sweetheart Minny Belle Tompkins to fight in Europe in World War I. He first tries to stop the war after meeting a young German sniper of the same name, who believes that the soldiers must unite. However, the commanders of the allied forces intend to use the discontent with the war among the German soldiers as a perfect time to advance in the war. Johnny then manages to bring the skirmish to a temporary halt by incapacitating a meeting of the generals with laughing gas, but once they recover they promptly reinstate the war, resulting in hundreds of thousands of fatalities. Meanwhile, Johnny finds himself committed to an asylum for ten years. He returns home to discover Minny Belle has married a capitalist, and he settles down as a toymaker who will create anything except tin soldiers, his personal gesture of peace in an increasingly warlike society.

The musical was written and composed by Green and Weill during the summer of 1936 in a rented old house located in Nichols, Connecticut near the summer rehearsal headquarters of the Group Theatre at Pine Brook Country Club. Its title was inspired by the fact the name appeared on United States casualty rolls more often than any other.

Productions and background

Weill was asked to develop the project by the socially conscious Group Theatre, but much of his music was scrapped when original director Harold Clurman was replaced by Lee Strasberg, who opted to emphasize text over music. The Broadway production opened on November 19, 1936 at the 44th Street Theatre, where it ran for 68 performances. The cast included Russell Collins as Johnny and Phoebe Brand as Minny Belle, with Luther Adler, Morris Carnovsky, Lee J. Cobb, Curt Conway, John Garfield, Elia Kazan, Robert Lewis, and Sandy Meisner in supporting roles.

A 1956 production was presented Off-Broadway at the Little Carnegie Playhouse at Carnegie Hall. It was directed by Stella Adler and starred among others James Broderick as Johnny Johnson and Gene Saks as the Mad Psychiatrist. It ran from October 21, 1956 through October 28. Samuel Matlowsky was the musical director and conducted the 1956 record album which had none of the cast from the Stella Adler production.

After 10 previews, a revival directed by José Quintero and choreographed by Bertram Ross opened on April 11, 1971 at the Edison Theatre, where it closed after one performance. The cast included Ralph Williams as Johnny and Alice Cannon as Minny Belle.

The play was staged by the Royal Shakespeare Company on 6–15 August 1986 at the Almeida Theatre, London directed by Paul Marcus.
The cast was Clive Mantle, Tina Marian, Michael McNally, Keith Osborn, Juliet Stevenson, Graham Turner and Andrew Yeats.

In 2009, a concert-staging was mounted in London by the Discovering Lost Musicals Charitable Trust, with Max Gold in the title role.

The ReGroup Theatre Company staged two sold-out staged readings that were directed by Estelle Parsons at the 47th St Theatre, in New York on December 12, 2011. Johnny was played by Pete McElligott, and his performances was named one of the 10 memorable performances of 2011 by Backstage.

Recordings
A November 1956 studio recording ("MGM Records" MGM E 3447, later released on Heliodor, Polydor, and online at ArkivMusik.com) has Burgess Meredith as Johnny, Evelyn Lear as Minny Belle, and Hiram Sherman as the Mad Psychiatrist; smaller roles are taken by Jane Connell, Lotte Lenya, and Thomas Stewart, and the conductor is Samuel Matlowsky.

A November 1996 recording (Erato 0630-17870-2) offers Donald Wilkinson as Johnny, Ellen Santaniello as Minny Belle, and Paul Guttry as the Mad Psychiatrist; Joel Cohen conducts.

Original Song List (Prior to Cuts)

Act One
"How Sweetly Friendship Binds"
Over in Europe - Mayor, Men and Women
Democracy Advancing - Minny Belle, Men and Women
Up Chickamauga Hill - Grandpa Joe, Men and Women
Democracy Advancing (Reprise) - Minny Belle, Mayor, Men and Women
Interlude: Johnny's Melody - Orchestra
"Keep The Home Fires Burning"
Aggie's Song - Aggie
Oh, Heart of Love - Minny Belle
Farewell, Goodbye - Minny Belle
"Your Country Needs Another Man-And That Means You"
Captain Valentine's Tango (Part I) - Captain Valentine
Democracy March - Orchestra
Captain Valentine's Tango (Part II) - Captain Valentine
Army Interlude - Orchestra
"Pack Up Your Troubles In Your Old Kit Bag"
The Sergeant's Chant - Sergeant
The West-Pointer's Song - West-Pointer and Soldiers
"A Light That Lighteth Men Their Way"
Farewell, Goodbye (Interlude)/Johnny's Song (Underscore) - Orchestra
Song of the Goddess - The Statue of Liberty

Act Two
"Lead Kindly Light"
Song of the Wounded Frenchmen (Nous Sommes Blesses)- Wounded French Soldiers
"There Is One Spot Forever England"
The Tea Song - An English Sergeant and English Soldiers
Oh the Rio Grande - Private Harwood
Johnny's Dream (Oh Heart of Love) - Minny Belle
Song of the Guns - The Guns
"If Thine Enemy Hunger-"
Music of the Stricken Redeemer - Orchestra
"'Tis Not So Deep As A Well-But 'Tis Enough. 'Twill Serve."
Mon Ami, My Friend - A French Nurse
"In The Multitude Of Counselors There Is Saftey" 
The Allied High Command - The Allied High Command
Dance of the Generals (We'll All Be Home For Christmas) - The Allied High Command and Johnny
"Still Stands Thine Ancient Artifice"
The Battle (with Reprise of the Dance of the Generals) - Johnny, American and German Soldiers
"There's Many A Mangled Body, A Blanket For Their Shroud"
In Time Of War and Tumult (Almighty God/Almachtiger Gott) - English and German Priests
"Dulce et Decorum est pro patira mori"
Song Of The Wounded Frenchmen (Reprise) - Orchestra
"Hail Mary, Full of Grace"
Reminiscence - Orchestra

Act Three
"Is There No Balm in Gilead, Is There No Physician There?"
The Psychiatry Song - Dr. Mahodan
"Out Of The Mouth Of Babes And Sucklings"
Asylum Chorus - Members of the Debating Society
Hymn to Peace (Round) - Members of the Debating Society
Asylum Chorus (Reprise) - Orchestra
"Whither Have Ye Made A Road?"
Johnny's Song - Johnny

1971 revival song list

Act 1
 Over in Europe
 Democracy's Call
 Up Chuckamauga Hill
 Johnny's Melody
 Aggie's Song
 Oh Heart of Love
 Farewell, Goodbye
 The Sergeant's Chant
 Valentine's Tango
 You're in the Army Now (Interlude)
 Johnny's Oath
 Song of the Goddess
 Song of the Wounded Frenchmen
 Tea Song
 Cowboy Song
 Johnny's Dream
 Song of the Guns
 Music of the Stricken Redeemer

Act 2
 Mon Ami My Friend
 Allied High Command
 The Laughing Generals
 The Battle
 Prayer: In Times of War and Tumults
 No Man's Land
 Song of the Goddess (Reprise)
 The Psychiatry Song
 Hymn to Peace
 Johnny Johnson's Song
 How Sweetly Friendship Binds
 Oh Heart of Love (Reprise)
 Johnny's Melody

See also
 List of anti-war songs

References

External links 
Donald Oenslager set design and diagrams for Johnny Johnson, 1936, held by the Billy Rose Theatre Division, New York Public Library for the Performing Arts

1936 musicals
Broadway musicals
Musicals by Kurt Weill
Musicals based on novels